Rengmitca is a critically endangered Kuki-Chin language of Bangladesh. It is distinct but closely related to the nearby languages Khumi and Mro. There are fewer than 30 speakers left as of 2014. Only 5 are completely fluent, all over the age of 60. But as of 2021 there are only 6 speaker of this language are left, most of whom are over the age of 60.

Rengmitca is spoken to the northeast of Alikadam town in the southern Chittagong Hill Tracts of Bangladesh.

Peterson (2017) classifies Rengmitca as a Khomic language.

References

Sources
Peterson, David A. 2013. "Rengmitca: The most endangered Kuki-Chin language of Bangladesh." In Nathan W. Hill and Thomas Owen-Smith, eds. Trans-Himalayan linguistics: Historical and descriptive linguistics of the Himalayan area, 313–327. Berlin: Mouton de Gruyter.
Peterson, David A. 2014. The dynamics of Rengmitca's endangerment. Paper presented at SoLE-3, Yunnan Nationalities University.

External links
Rediscovery of Rengmitca language in Bandarban

Kuki-Chin languages
Languages of Bangladesh